The Christ Church at the Quarry is a historic church in Gambier, Ohio. It was built in 1863 and added to the National Register of Historic Places in 1975.

It is a "beautiful stone chapel" with both Gothic and Celtic design influences, with exterior walls built of stone cut from a nearby quarry.

It derived from Kenyon College students' starting a mission in Gambier and opening a Sunday School.  Then participants in the mission sought to build a church.  It is likely that the church was designed by architect William Tinsley.  Tinsley designed Ascension Hall on the Kenyon College campus around that time.

References

Churches in Ohio
Churches on the National Register of Historic Places in Ohio
Churches completed in 1863
Buildings and structures in Knox County, Ohio
National Register of Historic Places in Knox County, Ohio